The 2013 Conference USA men's soccer tournament was the nineteenth edition of the Conference USA Men's Soccer Tournament. The tournament decided the Conference USA champion and guaranteed representative into the 2013 NCAA Division I Men's Soccer Championship. The tournament was hosted by the University of North Carolina at Charlotte and the games were played at Transamerica Field.

Bracket

Schedule

Quarterfinals

Semifinals

Final

Statistics

Goalscorers

Own goal
(South Carolina scored for Tulsa)
(Charlotte scored for UAB)

Awards

All-Tournament team
Giuseppe Gentile, Charlotte (Offensive MVP)
Thomas Allen, Charlotte (Defensive MVP)
Brandt Bronico, Charlotte
Tyler Gibson, Charlotte
Callum Irving, Kentucky
Charlie Reymann, Kentucky
Jordan Wilson, Kentucky
Tim Hopkinson, Old Dominion
Akeil Barrett, Tulsa
Jake McGuire, Tulsa
Tony Rocha, Tulsa

References

External links
 

Conference USA Men's Soccer Tournament
Tournament
Conference USA Men's Soccer Tournament
Conference USA Men's Soccer Tournament